Disa cardinalis is a species of orchid found in South Africa (S. Cape Prov. - Riversdale).

References

External links

 
 

cardinalis
Orchids of South Africa